Zero Hour (stylized as ZERØ HØUR) is an American conspiracy television series, created by Paul Scheuring and starring Anthony Edwards.  In the U.S., the pilot episode became available on Hulu Plus , then the series began airing on ABC on February 14, 2013 as a midseason replacement. On March 1, after the third episode, ABC canceled the series due to low ratings and immediately removed it from the schedule. On April 26, 2013, it was announced that the remaining episodes would be burned off through the dead of summer, beginning with two episodes on June 15 and ending on August 3, 2013.

Zero Hour aired in Canada on the Global Television Network for the first three episodes until ABC canceled it, later running the remaining episodes through the summer. Zero Hour aired via the Fox network in Italy, Spain and the Danish Broadcasting Corporation. Zero Hour was announced in 2012 as due to air in Australia on the Seven Network in 2013, but did not premiere until July 13, 2015 in an overnight timeslot, starting at 11:30 p.m.

Plot 
Hank Galliston (Anthony Edwards), publisher of a paranormal-skeptics magazine, gets caught up in a hunt for the holiest of relics going back to the early days of Nazi Germany after his wife, Laila (Jacinda Barrett), is abducted.

Cast and characters

Main 
 Anthony Edwards as Hank Galliston
 Carmen Ejogo as Agent Beck Riley
 Scott Michael Foster as Arron Martin
 Addison Timlin as Rachel Lewis
 Jacinda Barrett as Laila Galliston
 Michael Nyqvist as White Vincent

Recurring 
 Amir Arison as Theodore Riley
 Dylan Baker as Agent Terrance Fisk
 Beth Dixon as Rose Galliston
 Charles S. Dutton as Father Mickle
 Jonathan Dwyer as Max
 Zach Grenier as Wayne Blanks
 Grace Gummer as Agent Paige Willis
 Amy Irving as Melanie Lynch
 Jamie Jackson as Reverend Mark
 Ken Leung as Father Reggie
 Jonathan Walker as Stan Jarvis
 Dan Ziskie as Roland Galliston

Episode opening structure 
Each episode begins with the view of the insides of ticking clockworks, focusing on one of the Roman numerals of the clock face, while the narrator recites a rhyming couplet relating the number to the title of the episode. Episode 1 begins with the number twelve, with each following episode counting down to the zero hour.

Production 
Zero Hours pilot and second episode were written by series co-creator and co-executive producer Paul T. Scheuring. The two episodes were directed by co-executive producer Pierre Morel. Lorenzo di Bonaventura and Dan McDermott are also co-executive producers for the series, which is produced by ABC Studios. ABC placed an order for the series in May 2012.

The series was pulled from ABC after only three episodes were aired, and it was cancelled on March 1, 2013.

Reception 
Reception for Zero Hour has been mixed. On Metacritic, the series received "generally unfavorable reviews", reflected by a Metascore of 39 out of 100, based on 29 reviews. The Wall Street Journals Dorothy Rabinowitz said the first episode was "so awash in multiplying complications [it] manages to maintain its coherence and even a significant measure of suspense." Verne Gay of Newsday called it "ambitious and intermittently entertaining," adding "Zero Hour—and its celebrated lead [Anthony Edwards]—don't quite hit all their marks. But at least the mystery's a hoot." The New York Daily News David Hinckley stated the series "dodges several bedrock problems that have torpedoed other recent attempts to make engaging series TV out of mystery thrillers", adding, "The question is whether Zero Hour can sustain [the setup] for 13 weeks, because what makes a good two-hour movie doesn't always make for 10 gripping hours of television." Mike Hale of The New York Times stated the series "is entirely dispensable, its silliness matched by its comic-book solemnity". The Washington Posts Hank Stuever called the series "rancid", adding "The dialogue is stilted and almost entirely expository. The plot is like receiving a coloring book that's already been colored. The grand mystery here fails to ignite interest." Tim Goodman from The Hollywood Reporter says the series is "worth the ride".

The premiere "marked the lowest-rated in-season debut for a scripted show ever on the network."

Starting on June 15, 2013, ABC began airing previously unaired episodes on the Saturday 8:00 p.m. time slot. Two back-to-back episodes aired on June 15, 2013.  The two-hour finale aired on August 3, 2013.

Episodes

Notes

References 

 General references

External links 
 

2010s American drama television series
2013 American television series debuts
2013 American television series endings
American action television series
American Broadcasting Company original programming
English-language television shows
Television series by ABC Studios
Television shows filmed in Montreal
Television series about conspiracy theories